Thomas Archer Ray (August 2, 1919 – April 6, 2010) was an American animator.

Career
Ray was born in Williams, Arizona. He began work at Warner Bros. Cartoons in 1937, working under Tex Avery for six months. He applied for a job at MGM and was hired. According to him, he got paid $18 a week, 6 times the money he got paid at the Warner Bros studio. After enlisting in March 1941, he was stationed at Fort MacArthur, and he rode on the same bus as Jimmy Stewart. He later worked at John Sutherland Productions, getting his first screen credit there with Destination Earth in 1956. In 1958, he returned to Warner Bros. and became a master animator in the Robert McKimson unit. After a brief stay in the Friz Freleng unit, he was assigned to work with the Chuck Jones unit, where he co-directed Adventures of the Road-Runner and several Bugs Bunny Show episodes. He followed Jones to Metro-Goldwyn-Mayer in 1963; there, he directed two Tom and Jerry compilation shorts, Matinee Mouse in 1966 and Shutter Bugged Cat in 1967.

His later credits include animation on Pink Panther shorts, Ralph Bakshi’s Heavy Traffic and Coonskin, Chuck Jones TV specials, numerous Filmation and Hanna-Barbera series, Tiny Toon Adventures and Animaniacs. Ray directed many episodes of various series including the Sunbow Productions animated series based on Hasbro properties and was also the director for episodes of Film Roman's Garfield and Friends.

After his retirement from the Los Angeles animation business in 1998, Ray founded his own animation studio, Tomstone Animation, first located in East Stroudsburg, Pennsylvania. Ray moved his studio to Virginia Beach, Virginiajust before he died in Virginia on April 6, 2010 aged 90.

Ray's sister, Brenda Ellen Ray, continues to live in Atlanta, Georgia. Ray's son, Thomas G. "Greg" Ray, and daughter, Donna Mouliot, followed him into the animation business.

References

External links
 
 Tomstone Animation Studios
 Tom Ray Filmography

1919 births
2010 deaths
Animators from Arizona
Film directors from Arizona
American animated film directors
People from Coconino County, Arizona
Place of birth missing
Warner Bros. Discovery people
Warner Bros. people
Warner Bros. Cartoons people
Hanna-Barbera people
Filmation people
Warner Bros. Animation people